Maori Scenes were 1898 New Zealand documentary films made by Joseph Perry of the Limelight Department of the Salvation Army in Australia.
Two or three films were shot about 2 December 1898, just after New Zealand's first film.

The earliest films are from the first of December 1898, the opening of the Auckland Industrial and Mining Exhibition, and Boxing Day that year, Uhlan winning the Auckland Cup at Ellerslie Racecourse.

References

1890s New Zealand films
1898 in New Zealand
1898 films
1890s short documentary films
Black-and-white documentary films
Films set in New Zealand
Limelight Department films
New Zealand short documentary films
New Zealand silent short films